DBDMH (also known as 1,3-Dibromo-5,5-Dimethylhydantoin) is an organic compound derived from the heterocycle called dimethylhydantoin. This white crystalline compound with a slight bromine odor is widely used as a disinfectant used for drinking water purification, recreational water treatment, as a bleaching agent in pulp and paper mills, and for treating industrial/commercial water cooling systems.  Its action does not involve the use of hypochlorous acid.

Mechanism of action
1,3-Dibromo-5,5-Dimethylhydantoin is a source of bromine, which is equivalent to hypobromous acid (HOBr). 
Br2X  +  2 H2O   →   2 HOBr  +  H2X
(Where H2X is 5,5-dimethylhydantoin)

With a pKa of 8.6, hypobromous acid partially dissociates in water:
HOBr  ⇌ H+  +  BrO−

Hypobromous acid serves as a source of "Br+," which produces bromide ions in the process of disinfection:
HOBr + live pathogens → Br− + dead pathogens

The resulting bromide ions can then undergo oxidation to hypobromous acid in the presence of an oxidizer of sufficient strength e.g. ozone, hypochlorous acid, potassium monopersulfate. This reoxidation process is commonly called "activation" of the bromide ion:
Br−  +  HOCl   →   HOBr  +  Cl−

References

External links
 MSDS

Disinfectants
Organobromides
Hydantoins